The RS-122 is a Georgian mobile multiple rocket launcher firing 122 mm rockets. It was developed in 2011 and put on production display in February 2012. The RS-122 is a heavily modified version of the Soviet BM-21 Grad. Its main characteristics are the armoured crew cabin (using elements from MRAP and BAE Caiman), improved firing, operational range and accuracy. The vehicle was developed by the state-owned Scientific Technical Centre Delta.

Technical characteristics
The rocket launcher is designed to defeat personnel, armored targets, artillery batteries, command posts and fortifications.
The RS-122 is capable of control fire without the preliminary preparation of a position and exposed crew action, thus minimizing the salvo time and maximizing unit protection.

Armor 
The vehicle's armoured crew cabin provides protection for its five-man crew in accordance to STANAG 4569 level 2 against shell splinter and fragments.

Transporter 

Gallery

See also
 BM-21 Grad
 RM-70 multiple rocket launcher
 WR-40 Langusta

References 

Multiple rocket launchers
Wheeled self-propelled rocket launchers
Military equipment of Georgia (country)
Military vehicles introduced in the 2010s